Crooked David may refer to:

 Dafydd Gam (c. 1380 – 1415), a Welsh medieval nobleman, prominent opponent of Owain Glyndŵr
 Black Dwarf (personage) (1740–1811), a Scottish dwarf, the inspiration for Sir Walter Scott's novel, The Black Dwarf